Ali Mehmet Güneş (born 23 November 1978) is a former professional footballer who played as a midfielder. Born in West Germany, he represented Turkey at international level.

Club career 
Güneş was born in Donaueschingen, West Germany. He started his career with SC Freiburg in 1997 and in 2002 he was signed by Turkish club Fenerbahçe where he stayed until 2004. The defender was then signed on by rivals Beşiktaş, but returned to his first club SC Freiburg in 2007 where he was released from on 15 June 2009. On 13 July 2009, he signed with Kasımpaşa.

International career 
Güneş has one cap for Turkey.

References

External links 
 
 
 

1978 births
Living people
German people of Turkish descent
People from Donaueschingen
Sportspeople from Freiburg (region)
Turkish footballers
Footballers from Baden-Württemberg
Association football midfielders
Turkey international footballers
Turkey B international footballers
Turkey under-21 international footballers
Bundesliga players
2. Bundesliga players
Süper Lig players
SC Freiburg players
Beşiktaş J.K. footballers
Fenerbahçe S.K. footballers
Kasımpaşa S.K. footballers
Bucaspor footballers